Agusti Pol (born 13 January 1977) is an Andorran football player. He has played for Andorra national team. His only goal for his country came in Andorra's first international match, a 6–1 defeat by Estonia on 13 November 1996.

National team statistics

International goal
Scores and results list Andorra's goal tally first.

References

External links

1977 births
Living people
Andorran footballers
Andorra international footballers
FC Andorra players
Association football midfielders